Risingbd.com is an online news portal in Bangladesh covering district and national news. The site publishes latest news in both Bengali and English Language. It started its journey on 26 April 2013 with the theme of highlighting Bangladesh positively to the national and international readers.

History
risingbd24.com launched initially in 2012 but the official launched date was 26 April 2013. Contents are arranged in various categories. The agency is financed by Walton group.

risingbd.com listed for approved news media from Ministry of Information, Bangladesh  by 30 July 2020

Editorial board

S M Zahid Hasan is the publisher of the news portal. Senior journalist M. M. Kayser is the acting editor.

See also
 BBC Bangla
 Bdnews24.com
 List of newspapers in Bangladesh

References

External links
 Risingbd Bangal Index Page (BN)
 Risingbd English Index Page (EN)
 Risingbd AMP Index Page (AMP)

Bangladeshi news websites
2013 establishments in Bangladesh